Hoekstra is a Frisian toponymic surname, meaning "from the corner" or "(river) bend". Notable people with the surname include:

André Hoekstra (born 1962), Dutch footballer
Arnout Hoekstra (born 1984), Dutch politician
Cecil Hoekstra (1935–2018), Canadian ice hockey player
Driekes Hoekstra (born 2000), Dutch folk singer
Ed Hoekstra (1937–2011), Dutch-Canadian ice hockey player
Han G. Hoekstra (1906–1988), Dutch poet
Hannah Hoekstra (born 1987), Dutch actress
Henk Hoekstra (1924–2009), Dutch politician
Hopi Hoekstra (born 1972), American evolutionary biologist
Kenn Hoekstra (born 1973), American video game designer
Jochem Hoekstra (born 1992), Dutch cyclist
Joel Hoekstra (born 1970), American guitarist
Johnny Hoekstra (1917–2006), American basketball player
Marten Hoekstra (born 1961), American businessman
 (1884–1941), Dutch speed skater
Paulus Hoekstra (born 1944), Dutch-born Belgian sprint canoer
Pete Hoekstra (born 1953), Dutch-American politician, Donald Trump's ambassador to the Netherlands
Peter Hoekstra (born 1973), Dutch footballer
Piet Hoekstra (born 1947), Dutch cyclist
Rein Jan Hoekstra (born 1941), Frisian-Dutch jurist and politician
Sanne Hoekstra (born 1992), Dutch handball player
Sjoerd Hoekstra (born 1959), Dutch rower
Tiny Hoekstra (born 1996), Dutch footballer
Wopke Hoekstra (born 1975), Dutch Politician

References

Surnames of Frisian origin